The Goodwood Overpass carries the Glenelg tram line over the Adelaide-Wolseley railway line in Adelaide, Australia.

History
When originally built, the Glenelg tram line crossed over the Adelaide-Wolseley railway line via a flat junction to the south of Goodwood railway station. As part of a project by the Municipal Tramways Trust to rebuild the tram line, an overpass was built in 1929. In 1978/79, the wooden deck was replaced with concrete. Although the overpass crosses over Goodwood railway station, there are no interchange facilities.

References

External links

Bridges completed in 1929
Buildings and structures in Adelaide
Railway bridges in South Australia
1929 establishments in Australia